The mutual majority criterion is a criterion used to compare voting systems. It is also known as the majority criterion for solid coalitions and the generalized majority criterion. The criterion states that if there is a subset S of the candidates, such that more than half of the voters strictly prefer every member of S to every candidate outside of S, this majority voting sincerely, the winner must come from S. This is similar to but stricter than the majority criterion, where the requirement applies only to the case that S contains a single candidate. This is also stricter than the majority loser criterion, where the requirement applies only to the case that S contains all but one candidate. The mutual majority criterion is the single-winner case of the Droop proportionality criterion.

The Schulze method, ranked pairs, instant-runoff voting, Nanson's method, and Bucklin voting pass this criterion. All Smith-efficient Condorcet methods pass the mutual majority criterion.

The plurality vote, two-round system, contingent vote, Black's method, and minimax satisfy the majority criterion but fail the mutual majority criterion.

The anti-plurality voting, approval voting, range voting, and the Borda count fail the majority criterion and hence fail the mutual majority criterion.

Methods which pass mutual majority but fail the Condorcet criterion can nullify the voting power of voters outside the mutual majority. Instant runoff voting is notable for excluding up to half of voters by this combination.

Methods which pass the majority criterion but fail mutual majority can have a spoiler effect, since if a non-mutual majority-preferred candidates wins instead of a mutual majority-preferred candidate, then if all but one of the candidates in the mutual majority-preferred set drop out, the remaining mutual majority-preferred candidate will win, which is an improvement from the perspective of all voters in the majority.

Examples

Borda count 
Majority criterion#Borda count
The mutual majority criterion implies the majority criterion so the Borda count's failure of the latter is also a failure of the mutual majority criterion. The set solely containing candidate A is a set S as described in the definition.

Minimax 

Assume four candidates A, B, C, and D with 100 voters and the following preferences:

The results would be tabulated as follows:

 [X] indicates voters who preferred the candidate listed in the column caption to the candidate listed in the row caption
 [Y] indicates voters who preferred the candidate listed in the row caption to the candidate listed in the column caption

Result: Candidates A, B and C each are strictly preferred by more than the half of the voters (52%) over D, so {A, B, C} is a set S as described in the definition and D is a Condorcet loser. Nevertheless, Minimax declares D the winner because its biggest defeat is significantly the smallest compared to the defeats A, B and C caused each other.

Plurality 
Assume the Tennessee capital election example.

There are 58% of the voters who prefer Nashville, Chattanooga and Knoxville over Memphis, so the three cities build a set S as described in the definition. But since the supporters of the three cities split their votes, Memphis wins under Plurality.

Score voting 
Majority criterion#Score voting
Score voting does not satisfy the Majority criterion. The set solely containing candidate A is a set S as described in the definition, but B is the winner. Thus, score voting does not satisfy the mutual majority criterion.

STAR voting

See also
 Majority criterion
 Majority loser criterion
 Voting system
 Voting system criterion

References

Electoral system criteria